The Queen's Park Shield is a football tournament for Scottish universities and colleges.

History
The shield was donated to the Scottish Amateur Football Association by Queen's Park Football Club of Glasgow in 1921. The Shield was intended to be for competition between teams representing the four Ancient Universities of Scotland – Aberdeen, Edinburgh, Glasgow and St Andrews. The inaugural competition was won by Aberdeen University.

The shield itself has a solid silver front with the crests of the four ancient universities surrounding an image of Hampden Park. A figure wearing a Queen's Park strip is on top. This is rare because the image is of Hampden Park before redevelopment.

Since the expansion of university numbers in Scotland, the competition has become in effect the elite cup for university football in Scotland. For a time, until the re-organisation of the British Universities and Colleges Sport leagues, it constituted the top division of university football in Scotland, but has now reverted to a knock-out cup.

In the 2019 Season Edinburgh College made history by becoming the first ever College to win the shield in the 98 years of the competition, defeating the most successful club Edinburgh University 5-4 on Penalties.

Past winners

References

Football cup competitions in Scotland
1921 establishments in Scotland
Recurring sporting events established in 1921
Student sport in Scotland